The 1972 Königs Wusterhausen air disaster occurred on 14 August when an Interflug Ilyushin Il-62 crashed shortly after take-off from Berlin-Schönefeld Airport in Schönefeld, East Germany, on a holiday charter flight to Burgas, Bulgaria. The accident was caused by a fire in the aft cargo bay. All 156 passengers and crew died. To date, it is the deadliest aviation accident in Germany.

Aircraft and crew
The aircraft was a Soviet-built Ilyushin IL-62 aircraft, registered DM-SEA, powered by four Kuznetsov NK-8 engines. It first flew in April 1970, and up until the accident had acquired 3,520 flight-time hours.

The aircrew consisted of 51-year-old captain Heinz Pfaff, 35-year-old first officer Lothar Walther, 32-year-old flight engineer Ingolf Stein, and 38-year-old navigator Achim Flilenius. The flight crew members had 8,100, 6,041, 2,258, and 8,570 hours of experience, respectively.

Crash
The Interflug flight left Berlin-Schönefeld Airport at 16:30 local time. Because of the summer holiday, the number of passengers – mainly tourists bound for the Bulgarian Black Sea Coast – almost reached the full capacity of the airliner. Takeoff proceeded normally, and the aircraft then headed southeast towards Czechoslovakia, now the Czech Republic.

The flight requested a return to Schönefeld but did not think the situation critical enough for an immediate landing at the nearest airport. At 16:51, the crew carried out a fuel dump to decrease landing weight. Meanwhile, flight attendants reported smoke in the rear section of the cabin. With Berlin-Schönefeld Airport already in sight a few kilometres south, the flight issued a mayday at 16:59:25, indicating problems controlling the aircraft's altitude. At this time, the flight crew was likely unaware that the fire had been consuming portions of the rear of the aircraft. A few seconds later, the tail section, weakened by the fire, separated from the aircraft, causing it to enter an uncontrolled descent. Due to the forces of the dive, the rest of the aircraft broke up in mid-air, the debris landing in the town of Königs Wusterhausen, East Germany.

Cause 

The pilot's last messages suggested that a fire in the rear of the aircraft was responsible for the accident. This part of the aircraft was not accessible from the cabin and had no smoke detectors, so the crew was unable to immediately grasp the severity of the situation. The fire was caused by a hot-air tube leak, through which air heated to some  escaped, damaging the insulation of electrical wires and the aircraft flight control system. After takeoff, the resulting short circuit caused  sparks, lighting a fire in Cargo Bay 4. The fire then spread until smoke reached the passenger cabin and the fuselage was weakened. Ultimately, the tail section failed in flight.

Memorial 
At the Wildau Cemetery, close to Königs Wusterhausen, a memorial commemorates the victims whose names are written on a black stone marker.

See also 

 LOT Polish Airlines Flight 5055
 South African Airways Flight 295
 Swissair Flight 111

References

External links
 Entry at aviation-safety.net
 www.interflug.biz
 

Aviation accidents and incidents in 1972
Aviation accidents and incidents in Germany
Accidents and incidents involving the Ilyushin Il-62
Airliner accidents and incidents caused by in-flight fires
Interflug accidents and incidents
1972 in East Germany
August 1972 events in Europe